Nguyen Van Hung may refer to:

Nguyễn Văn Hùng
Peter Nguyen Van Hung (born 1958), Vietnamese Australian Catholic priest and human rights activist
Nguyễn Văn Hùng (martial artist) (born 1980), Vietnamese martial artist and pro basketball player
Nguyễn Văn Hùng (athlete) (born 1989), Vietnamese triple jumper
Nguyễn Văn Hùng (politician) (born 1961), Vietnamese politician, Minister of Culture, Sports and Tourism

Nguyễn Văn Hưng
Nguyễn Văn Hưng (born 1958), Vietnamese general and member of the National Assembly